This article traces the history of Dallas, Texas (USA) during the mid-20th century from 1946 to 1974.

Technology 
In 1958 a version of the integrated circuit was invented in Dallas by Jack Kilby of Texas Instruments; this event punctuated the Dallas area's development as a center for high-technology manufacturing (though the technology Mr. Kilby developed was soon usurped by a competing technology simultaneously developed in the "Silicon Valley" in California by engineers who would go on to form Intel Corporation).  During the 1950s and 1960s, Dallas became the nation's third-largest technology center, with the growth of such companies as Ling-Temco-Vought (LTV Corporation) and Texas Instruments.

Development 
In 1957, developers Trammell Crow and John M. Stemmons, opened a Home Furnishings Mart that grew into the Dallas Market Center, the largest wholesale trade complex in the world. The same year, the Dallas Memorial Auditorium (now the Dallas Convention Center) opened near Canton and Akard Streets in what is now the Convention Center District of downtown.

Kennedy assassination 

On November 22, 1963, United States President John F. Kennedy was assassinated on Elm Street while his motorcade passed through Dealey Plaza in downtown Dallas. Texas Governor John Connally was seriously wounded by the first bullet to hit Kennedy but survived.

References

External links
 
 Dallas History from the Dallas Historical Society

1946-1974